Sir Thomas Cecil Russell Moore, 1st Baronet CBE (16 September 1886 – 9 April 1971) was a long-serving Scottish Unionist Party politician. He was elected Member of Parliament (MP) for Ayr Burghs in a 1925 by-election, and served until his retirement in 1964, when he was succeeded by George Younger. Moore was created a Baronet, of Kyleburn in the County of Ayr, in 1956. He died in April 1971, aged 84, when the baronetcy became extinct. In the mid-1930s Moore, a Colonel in the British Army, wrote widely in the UK press in support of Adolf Hitler and the policies of Nazism.

References

External links 
 

1886 births
1971 deaths
Baronets in the Baronetage of the United Kingdom
Commanders of the Order of the British Empire
Members of the Parliament of the United Kingdom for Scottish constituencies
Unionist Party (Scotland) MPs
UK MPs 1924–1929
UK MPs 1929–1931
UK MPs 1931–1935
UK MPs 1935–1945
UK MPs 1945–1950
UK MPs 1950–1951
UK MPs 1951–1955
UK MPs 1955–1959
UK MPs 1959–1964